The Autonomous Action (AD; ; Avtonomnoye deystviye, AD) is a revolutionary anarchist federation in Russia, Belarus and Ukraine that was founded in January 2002.

AD is composed of anarcho-communists, syndicalists, autonomists, and radical ecologists. Autonomous Action also had members in Armenia — "Proryv", that group having since been terminated by the end of 2005.

Autonomous Action utilizes direct action "to create a tradition and basis for a new humanist culture, social self-organisation and radical resistance against militarism, capitalism, sexism and fascism".

Unlike leftist political parties in Russia, Autonomous Action refuses to acknowledge the existing political system as legitimate, often criticizing leftist movements that participate in the public political sphere. The group also is strongly critical of other opposition movements in Russia, most notably the Liberal Opposition due to their compliance with Russian elections and refusal to announce revolutionary calls to action. Some members of Autonomous Action go as far as to suggest that much of the Liberal Opposition is under the Kremlin's guidance as controlled opposition, even groups and individuals without established political parties.

Summary of politics
On the official website of the organization reported that "independent action" was established in January 2002 as well. 25–27 January 2002 in Nizhny Novgorod was the 1st Founding Congress of the movement.

Basic principles that unite members of the organization:
Anti-authoritarianism,
Anti-capitalism,
Anti-fascism, Anti-nationalism,
Anti-Bolshevism,
Self-governance,
Antimilitarism,
Environmentalism,
Anti-sexism,
New humanist culture,
Anti-clericalism

Activists of the "Autonomous Action" call themselves the autonomy, and their struggle for an autonomous because the act itself, regardless of the bureaucratic system.

Participants seek to create a system of national government - the federation of free individuals, groups, communities, regions and countries. According to "Autonomous Action", the bodies of coordination between these groups may be independent councils or other institutions of public government, formed by general meetings based on the principles of delegating the right of immediate withdrawal of the delegates.

The group further published an official “alternative to Putin”, on February 13, 2021, which included:
The complete abolition of the presidency.
The establishment of a system of collectively elected bodies that pass all laws in the nation (Autonomous Action does not recognize the State Duma as a legitimate institution).
A prohibition of secret ballot in parliaments and self-government bodies of any level. This further includes a list of names of the deputies who voted on laws and ballots that would be published online.  
An introduction of a new procedure that allows voters to recall elected officials at any given moment.

They further published two additional goals that would need to be achieved in order to ensure freedom of political discussion:
The complete disbanding of the “political police” - the Anti-Extremism Centers and the Federal Security Bureau - due to their role as criminal organizations “actively engaged in repression against opponents of the current government”. These repressions include murder and the falsification of criminal cases.
A complete repeal of the law “On Counteracting Extremist Activity” and the corresponding articles of the Criminal Code.  

The ideology of "autonomous action" based on the world revolutionary libertarian communist ideas. Ideas and social theory, taken into service, are not confined only within the framework of anarchism. According to  supporters of AD, at present, in the context of the current situation in the country and the world, the need for a qualitatively new strategy that meets today's current living conditions. Among the members of the association may be platformists, syndicalists libertarian Marxist, radical environmentalists, communitarians, "New Left" and so on.

According to AD, at present, in the context of the current situation in the country and in the world, it is necessary to develop a qualitatively new strategy that meets today's actual living conditions.

The main print projects of Autonomous Action are journal «Avtonom» and the newspaper «Situatsiya». In 2004, the members of the organization founded the Antijob project.

Autonomous Action believes that centuries of authoritarianism in Russia, specifically, the concentration the state's power in the hands of one person whether that be the Russian Kingdom, Russian Empire, the Soviet Union, or the Russian Federation, has never brought benefit to the people. Instead, the group asserts that power corrupts, and often creates a huge danger of the nation slipping into dictatorship.

Autonomous Action recognizes numerous examples of collective forms of government throughout history that it views as examples to be followed, even if participation in government was not available to all residents such as in the ancient city-states or the Novgorod and Pskov veche republics. The group also looks to the numerous areas throughout modern Russia during the revolutionary period of 1917-1918 where deputies were elected and accountable to all members of the Soviet population. Autonomous Action further supports the anti-Bolshevik uprising in Kronstadt in 1921, referring to the revolutionaries there as supporters of the true power of the Soviets.

Further universal grassroots self-government that the group refers to include: the Makhnovshchina, communes during the Spanish Civil War of 1936, and modern day Kurdistan where “the people living there have the opportunity to determine their own lives”.

With that said, Autonomous Action advocates for a society in which collective decision-making distributes power more evenly and promotes public debate and transparent discussion. The characterize "normal political life" as that when different groups in society freely defend their vision of the further development of society.

Views on Vladimir Putin
Autonomous Action is heavily critical of President Vladimir Putin's administration referring to him as а Тsar that has entrenched himself in power alongside his corrupt friends and former colleagues. The group blames Vladimir Putin, as the successor of Yeltsin, for the continued failures of the nation to take care of its people, and for the ongoing repressions in the nation.

The group attributes Pro-Putinist sentiment in the West to a misguided frustration with their own ruling capitalist elite, with westerners viewing Putin not as a power-hungry dictator, but instead as a viable alternative that can be supported due to his ability to induce fear in a nation's elites. Autonomous Action warns western Putinists (such as international fighters joining the Donbas War on the side of the breakaway republics, as well as those within Russia, that Putin is not “some kind of Che Guevara” who desires to dismantle the existing status-quo of Western elitist domination, but rather, he is a part of his own corrupt capitalist elite (primarily composed of his friends and former colleagues in the Federal Security Bureau), and simply seeks to remain in power for as long as he can since as soon as he steps down from power, he will be put on trial for corruption among various other crimes.

Ultimately, Autonomous Action desires the removal and persecution of Vladimir Putin and his administration under corruption charges, as well as for the repression of opposition figures through murder and falsification of criminal charges.

Views on other leftist movements
Autonomous Action characterizes many of the contemporary neo-Soviet movements with “red-brownism” (krasno-korichnevye), a modern phenomenon in former Soviet republics (primarily in Russia) that combines aspects of Soviet imperialism with right-wing conservatism, especially regarding social issues. The philosophy was popularized in the 1990s, especially during the 1993 Constitutional Crisis which saw many far-left and far-right movements band together to combat President Yeltsin's economic reforms. A primary proponent of the red-brown ideology in the 1990s was the National Salvation Front (Front natsional'nogo spaseniya) whose membership later became integrated into modern political parties such as the ultranationalist Liberal Democratic Party of Russia and the Communist Party of Russia. Red-brownism is most closely associated with “Red-fascism” in Western nations.

Autonomous Action views the successor to the Communist Party of the Soviet Union, the Communist Party of the Russian Federation, as controlled opposition, similar to the other political parties in the Russian State Duma. Though they highlight that the Communist Party acts more opposingly to Vladimir Putin and United Russia when compared to parliamentary parties such as the Liberal Democratic Party of Russia (LDPR), Autonomous Action labels these actions as controlled theatrics, stating that the party is merely creating “a show for the average people” in order to create an illusion of parliamentary opposition to Putin.

Autonomous Action further compares the Russian Communist Party, and other leftist parties in favor of "patriotic values", a philosophy very strongly propagated by Vladimir Putin's government and almost all political parties in parliament, to the NSDAP. They state that Gennady Zyuganov, head of the CPRF, has instated the following 9 values as guiding principles for Communist Party:
There is no proletariat. We need to protect ethnically Russian and patriarchal heritage.
To defend the Russians, we need a strong homeland - a state.
Every Russian should be a patriot.
A strong family is the backbone of the state.
Orthodoxy is not only the support of the state, but also the primordially Russian religion. Those who are not Orthodox are not Russian.
We [the Communist Party and Russian state] must try to combine Orthodoxy and the "Soviet experience."
Capitalism and private property in industry are essential.
Internationalism should be understood as the expansion of the "Russian idea" into neighboring countries.
All who are against the above principles are enemies of Russia. These include Trotskyists, agents of the State Department, etc.

Autonomous Action, along with other far-left, anti-government groups have strongly criticized the CPRF for being hypocrites to their own ideology, refusing to remain ideologically pure to a proletariat revolution and instead diluting their values with right-wing principles in order to not be punished by the government. Autonomous Action further states that the CPRF refuses to concretely criticize Vladimir Putin and the Russian government, instead opting for "nationalistic content in a socialist wrapper". The group also states that the CPRF and its affiliates have done nothing to support workers rights or acknowledge worker exploitation in Russia.

Views on Alexei Navalny
Autonomous Action believes that Alexei Navalny's political career is based on a false and naive notion that Russia can pursue politics “normally”, such as in Western parliamentarism. They view his actions as a performance for the people to believe that normalcy is possible in Russia and characterizes his supporters as those who simply refuse to believe in the obvious: that corruption investigations, participation in elections, and voting for the opposition, will never have an effect in Russia.

Despite holding such a view on parliamentary politics, Autonomous Action does believe that Western style politics, such as what Navalny is advocating for, can be achieved when Putin leaves power. The group states that if Navalny is still alive by the time Putin leaves, there will be great political opportunities for him, though membership of the group, similar to much of the Russian political-left, remains skeptical about whether to support him or not due to his previous ties with Russian nationalist groups, his attendance of the 2006 Russian March (an annual march of Russian nationalists), as well as his self-proclamation of being a "Nationalist Democrat" and views on immigration.

Autonomous Action further believes that given the inability to pursue “normal” parliamentary politics in Russia, the only alternatives are more desperate measures. An example cited in Antti Rautiainen's article, the Arkhangelsk FSB office bombing in 2018, where he concludes that few in Russia are ready to support too desperate measures, and fewer are willing to commit such actions themselves. He states the problem of Russian opposition movement as to find such forms of resistance to be both effective and accessible.

Some members of Autonomous Action view the poisoning of Alexei Navalny as an unfortunate event, though not because the FSB targeted him, but because they inadvertently turned Navalny into a national hero. They view Navalny's political career with a growing worry as it allegedly grows in similarity to that of Yeltsin, and fear that if his popularity grows too much, he will simply replace Putin at the helm of the Russian government and will only change Russia for the worse (such as Yeltsin did, according to the group).

On "Smart Voting" and the 2021 Russian legislative election
In a statement released on September 2, 2021, Autonomous Action reaffirmed their views that elections in Russia, specifically the State Duma Elections of 2021 are illegitimate, and criticized Alexei Navalny's Smart Voting strategy as pointless, and “unable to amount to anything”. Though they did not officially announce a boycott of the election, Autonomous Action stated that by voting in them, one acknowledges the legitimacy of the existing system and thus, subsequently promotes it.

Views on the war in Donbas
Autonomous Action's Moscow branch officially stated that it recognizes the conflict in Ukraine as a war between fascist groups backed by capitalist nations. The group's membership generally agrees with other anti-war leftist rhetoric, stating that both state actors (and the subsequent governments) are prolonging this war for their benefit; Putin using a neighboring conflict within the former Soviet Union to distract the Russian people from the ongoing domestic financial crisis while Poroshenko weaponized the conflict to flame nationalist sentiment and legitimize his own government after the 2014 Maidan Revolution. The group has concluded that the ultimate goal of the perpetuation of the war in Donbas is to prevent Ukraine from joining NATO, securing Russia's southern European flank from military aggression.

The group believes that organizations using “anti-fascist” as а “simple label, which does not have anything to do with the reality”, and that there exists no genuine anti-capitalist resistance in the conflict, on either side.

Views on international movements
Autonomous Action praises the PKK and Kurdish militias that fought off the Islamic State, as well as the Zapatista's in Mexico, though many members of the group remain weary of possible nationalistic sentiment within these resistance movements clouding anarchist thought.

In regards to the Kurdish national movement, Autonomous Action has stated that it is not overall anarchist, with only some of its members advocating for a stateless society. Though most of Ocalan's (key founder of Kurdish resistance in Turkey) supporters adhere to the concept of a democratic secular state, and the legal wing of the PKK, the Kurdish HDP party participating in Turkish parliamentary elections, Autonomous Action believes that the Kurdish national movement has a great future ahead of them. The group further recognizes the many libertarian elements of the Kurdish movement (confederalism, cooperatives, direct municipal democracy) and suggests that such elements can become a platform for the further development of libertarian socialist thought and anarchist ideas (if the anarchists in the movement decide to do so).

Split
In August 2013, at the XII Congress of Autonomous Action there was an intra-organizational conflict that grew into a split in the organization. For several months, two organizations were operating in Russia, bearing the name "Autonomous Action" and standing on similar libertarian-communist positions. However, on October 27, 2013, the breakaway part of the participants adopted the name Autonomous Action (Social-Revolutionary) (ADSR) (later this organization was renamed "People's Self-Defense").

Currently, "Autonomous Action" positions itself as a "libertarian media group" and aims to promote the libertarian and anarchist alternative through the creation of high-quality and modern news and analytical resources.

Notable members
Anastasia Baburova
Antti Rautiainen
Pyotr Ryabov
Vadim Kurylev

See also
Anarchism in Russia
New Revolutionary Alternative

References

External links
Autonomous Action (English Site)
Anarchism and Nationalism in Armenia. Organise!, Summer 2007

Anarchism in Armenia
Anarchism in Belarus
Anarchist organizations in Russia
Anarchist organizations in Ukraine
Anti-fascist organisations in Ukraine
Belarusian opposition
Opposition to Vladimir Putin
Russian democracy movements
Ukrainian democracy movements
Political organizations based in Russia